Xanthomonas perforans is a species of bacteria.

External links
Type strain of Xanthomonas perforans at BacDive -  the Bacterial Diversity Metadatabase

Xanthomonadales